Ninu may refer to:

 -ninu, ancient perfume-maker who worked with Tapputi
 Emil Ninu (born 1986), Romanian football player
 Ninu Cremona (1880–1972), Maltese writer and health inspector
 Ninu Zammit (born 1952), Maltese politician